The 1972 United States Senate election in Wyoming was held on November 7, 1972. Incumbent Republican Senator Clifford Hansen ran for re-election to a second term. He was challenged by Democratic nominee Mike Vinich, a former aide to Congressman Teno Roncalio and a bar owner in Hudson. As Hansen ran for re-election, President Richard Nixon was overwhelmingly defeating Democratic presidential nominee George McGovern in Wyoming. Hansen managed to outperform even Nixon, winning his second term in a landslide over Vinich.

Democratic primary

Candidates
 Mike Vinich, Hudson bar owner, former Director of the Wyoming Employment Security Commission
 Doyle Henry, handyman
 Patrick E. Shanklin
 William E. Fritchell, maintenance worker

Results

Republican Primary

Candidates
 Clifford Hansen, incumbent U.S. Senator

Results

General election

Results

References

Wyoming
1972
1972 Wyoming elections